Seven Sisters may refer to:
 Pleiades, or Seven Sisters, a star cluster named for Pleiades (Greek mythology), the seven sisters who are companions of Artemis in Greek mythology

Arts and entertainment

Music
 Seven Sisters (Beta Radio album), an album by the American band Beta Radio
 Seven Sisters (Meja album), an album by the Swedish composer and singer Meja
 "Seven Sisters", an instrumental piece by Tori Amos from Her 2011 album, Night of Hunters
 "Seven Sisters", a song by American band MewithoutYou from their album, Catch for Us the Foxes
 "Seven Sisters", a song by American metal band The Sword from their album, Apocryphon
 Seven Sisters: A Kentucky Portrait, 2003 album by the San Francisco bluegrass group The Crooked Jades
 "The Seven Sisters", a song by American band Rainer Maria from their album, A Better Version of Me
 "The Seven Sisters", a song by electronic-rock artist Celldweller from his album, Wish Upon a Blackstar

The Seven Sisters are referenced by the band Ghost in their song ‘Respite on the Spitalfields’ on their 2022 album ‘Impera’.

Films
 The Seven Sisters (film), a 1915 silent film 
 We Were Seven Sisters, a 1939 film
 What Happened to Monday, a 2017 film known as Seven Sisters in several European countries, Canada, and Japan

Books and plays
 The Seven Sisters (play), an 1860 play
 The Seven Sisters, a 1975 book by Anthony Sampson about the Seven Sisters (oil companies)
 The Seven Sisters (novel), 1992 novel by Margaret Drabble
 The Seven Sisters, 2014–present book series by Lucinda Riley

Theatre
Seven Sisters Group, a 1990 British performance company

Other media
 Seven sisters (studios), the seven original major movie studios
 Seven Sisters (magazines), a group of American women's magazines
 Seven Sisters (Forgotten Realms), fictional characters from the Forgotten Realms role-playing game

Biology
Seven Sisters Oak, largest southern live oak registered in the U.S.
 Jungle babbler, a type of bird known as seven sisters in northern India
 Crinum americanum, a plant commonly known as seven sisters
 Sterculia monosperma, a type of nut from Southern China known as seven sisters' fruit

Organizations
 Big Oil prior to the 1970s oil crisis, of which seven companies, referred to as the "Seven Sisters", dominated the oil industry 
 Seven Sisters (colleges), the name given to seven US liberal arts colleges that are historically women's colleges
 Seven Sisters (law firms), seven Canadian law firms

Places

Asia 

 Northeast India, seven states commonly called the Seven Sisters

Australia
 Seven Sisters (Queensland), a group of small mountains on the Atherton Tableland in Australia

Continental Europe
 Seven Sisters (Moscow), a group of skyscrapers in Russia
 Seven Sisters Waterfall, Norway, Geirangerfjord
 De syv søstre (Seven Sisters), a mountain formation in Helgeland, Norway

Ireland
 Seven Sisters, Donegal, a mountain chain in County Donegal, Ireland

North America
 Seven Sisters (Massachusetts), a group of ridgeline knobs in the Holyoke Range of Western Massachusetts, US
 Seven Sisters, Baja California, seven surfing point breaks in Baja California, Mexico
 Seven Sisters Falls, Manitoba, a community in Manitoba, Canada
 Seven Sisters Mountain, Alberta, Canada
 Seven Sisters Peaks, British Columbia, Canada

United Kingdom

England
 Seven Sisters, London
Seven Sisters station, a rail and Tube station
Seven Sisters Road, North London
 Seven Sisters (Quantock Hills), a prominent Somerset landmark 
 Seven Sisters Road, St Lawrence, Isle of Wight
Seven Sisters, Sussex, a group of chalk cliffs
 Seven Sisters Rocks,  Symonds Yat, Herefordshire

Wales
 Seven Sisters, Neath Port Talbot, a village
 Seven Sisters (electoral ward), an electoral ward, Neath Port Talbot

China

Hong Kong
 Tsat Tsz Mui (Seven Sisters), an area and road  in Hong Kong

India
 Seven Sister States, a region in northeastern India

Other uses

 The Seven Sisters songline, a creation (Dreamtime) story in Aboriginal Australian mythology,
linked to Australian Aboriginal astronomy
 Seven Sisters of American Protestantism, mainline Protestant denominations
 Seven Sisters (Sette Sorelle), top Italian Serie A football clubs

See also
Pleiades in folklore and literature, often termed the Seven Sisters